Žarko Ćulum (born 02 January 1996) is a Serbian judoka. He won European U-23 Championships bronze in 2017 in Podgorica.

Achievements

References

External links
 

1996 births
Living people
Serbian male judoka
European Games competitors for Serbia
Judoka at the 2019 European Games
Sportspeople from Banja Luka
Mediterranean Games gold medalists for Serbia
Mediterranean Games medalists in judo
Competitors at the 2018 Mediterranean Games
Serbs of Bosnia and Herzegovina
21st-century Serbian people